Agnes Terei was a Vanuatuan educator and politician. In 1965 she became the first woman appointed to the Advisory Council of the New Hebrides.

Biography
Terei worked as an assistant teacher at the Sainte Therese mission school in Espiritu Santo. In December 1965 she was appointed to the Advisory Council, becoming its first female member.

References

Vanuatuan educators
Members of the Parliament of Vanuatu
Vanuatuan women in politics
20th-century women politicians
20th-century women educators